Fairview is a historic home located in St. George's Hundred north of Odessa, New Castle County, Delaware.  It was built about 1850, and is a -story, five-bay, frame house with a three bay front porch. It has a gable roof with dormers.  The house is sheathed in asbestos siding over weatherboard.

It was listed on the National Register of Historic Places in 1985.

References

Houses on the National Register of Historic Places in Delaware
Houses completed in 1850
Houses in New Castle County, Delaware
National Register of Historic Places in New Castle County, Delaware